Martha Luz Lopez (born 12 August 1968) is a road cyclist from Colombia. She represented her nation at the 2001 UCI Road World Championships. She won in 2001 the bronze medal in the road race at the Pan American championships.

References

External links
 profile at Cyclingarchives.com

1968 births
Colombian female cyclists
Living people
Place of birth missing (living people)
20th-century Colombian women
21st-century Colombian women